The gun debate may refer to:

 Gun politics
 Gun politics in the United States
 Gun control